Silver Lining is the fourteenth album by Bonnie Raitt, released in 2002.

Track listing
"Fool's Game" (Jon Cleary) – 4:08
"I Can't Help You Now" (Gordon Kennedy, Wayne Kirkpatrick, Tommy Sims) – 3:13
"Silver Lining" (David Gray) – 6:19
"Time of Our Lives" (Teron Beal, Tommy Sims) – 4:00
"Gnawin' on It" (Raitt, Roy Rogers) – 4:44
"Monkey Business" (Jon Cleary) – 3:36
"Wherever You May Be" (Alan Darby, Gavin Hodgson) – 5:31
"Valley of Pain" (Rob Mathes, Allen Shamblin) – 4:27
"Hear Me Lord" (Oliver "Tuku" Mtukudzi) – 5:09
"No Gettin' Over You" (Raitt) – 4:45
"Back Around" (Habib Koité, Raitt) – 5:15
"Wounded Heart" (Jude Johnstone) – 4:13

Personnel 
 Bonnie Raitt – lead vocals, slide guitar, backing vocals (1), organ arrangements (3), horn arrangements (5)
 Jon Cleary – keyboards, backing vocals, duet vocals (1)
 Mitchell Froom – organ, synthesizers, clavinet (2), marxophone (3), additional acoustic piano (3)
 George Marinelli – acoustic guitar, electric guitar, harmony vocals (3), backing vocals (9), mandolin (10)
 James "Hutch" Hutchinson – bass guitar, acoustic guitar (11)
 Ricky Fataar – drums, percussion, backing vocals (9)
 Steve Berlin – baritone saxophone
 Tommy Sims – backing vocals, electric guitar (4)
 Bernard Fowler – backing vocals
with:
 Benmont Tench – acoustic piano (12)
 Roy Rogers – slide guitar (5)
 Andy Abad – lead guitar (9)
 Habib Koité – gut-string guitar (10)
 Andrew Scheps – drum loops (2)
 Gary Gold – snare drum (5)
 Pete Thomas – percussion (8)
 Alex Acuña – congas (9), talking drum (9)
 Souleymane Ann – calabash (10)
 Mahamadou Kone – talking drum (10)
 Kélétigui Diabaté – balafon (10)
 Freebo – tuba (9)
 Steve Raitt – backing vocals (1)
 Arnold McCuller – backing vocals (7)
 Fred White – backing vocals (7)

Production
 Producers – Bonnie Raitt, Tchad Blake and Mitchell Froom.
 Pre-Production Assistant – Tom Corwin
 Tracks 1-10 & 12 recorded by Tchad Blake, assisted by Jacquie Blake.
 Track 11 recorded by John Paterno, assisted by Adam Samuels.
 Overdubs on Track 2 recorded by John Paterno, assisted by Craig Conrad.
 Mixed by Tchad Blake
 Mix Assistant on Track 2 – Claire Lewis
 Mixed at Real World Studios (Wiltshire, England).
 ProTools Engineer – Jacquie Blake
 Mastered by Bob Ludwig at Gateway Mastering (Portland, ME).
 Art Direction and Design – Norman Moore
 Photography – Tchad Blake, Ann Cutting, Henry Diltz and Pat Johnson
 Stylist – Kate Lindsay
 Make-up – Lucienne Zammit

Charts

Weekly charts

Year-end charts

Singles

References

External links
 

Bonnie Raitt albums
2002 albums
Albums produced by Tchad Blake
Albums produced by Mitchell Froom
Capitol Records albums